Shanyang may refer to the following locations in China:

Shanyang County (山阳县), county in Shaanxi
Shanyang Formation (山阳组), geological formation
Shanyang District (山阳区), Jiaozuo, Henan
Huai'an District, Jiangsu, formerly Shanyang County
Shanyang Commandery (山陽郡), historical commandery in China
Shanyang, Gutian County (杉洋镇), town in Fujian